The National Socialist Flyers Corps (NSFK) was a paramilitary aviation organization of the Nazi Party.

History
NSFK was founded 15 April 1937 as a successor to the German Air Sports Association; the latter had been active during the years when a German air force was forbidden by the Treaty of Versailles.  The NSFK organization was based closely on the para-military organization of the Sturmabteilung (SA).  A similar group was the National Socialist Motor Corps (NSKK). During the early years of its existence, the NSFK conducted military aviation training in gliders and private airplanes.

Leadership
Friedrich Christiansen, originally a Generalleutnant then later a Luftwaffe General der Flieger, was NSFK Korpsführer from 15 April 1937 until 26 June 1943, followed by Generaloberst Alfred Keller until 8 May 1945.

Ranks, uniforms and other insignia
The paramilitary rank system was in use by the NSFK between the years of 1933 and 1945.  The ranks were designed after paramilitary rank titles of the Sturmabteilung. Most ranks of the NSFK were also used by the National Socialist Motor Corps which maintained its own paramilitary rank system.

As with most Nazi paramilitary groups, rank patches were worn on a single collar opposite a badge of unit membership.  The exception was for the ranks Standartenführer and above which displayed rank insignia on both collars.

Rank insignia
As of 1934, the final rank pattern of the National Socialist Flyer Corps was as follows:

Uniforms

Source:

Rank flags

Source:

NSFK badges
 The Free Balloon Pilot Badge (Das Abzeichen für Freiballonführer). This was authorized on 10 March 1938 by NSFK Korpsführer, Christiansen.
 The Motor Aircraft Pilot Badge (Das Abzeichen für Motorflugzeugführer). This was authorized on 12 July 1938 by Christiansen. 
 The Large Glider Flyer Badge (Das Große Segelfliegerabzeichen). This was authorized on 26 January 1942 by Christiansen.

References

Further reading

Nazi Party organizations
Irregular military air services
Military wings of fascist parties
Military units and formations established in 1937
1937 establishments in Germany
Military units and formations disestablished in 1945
1945 disestablishments in Germany
Military gliding
Gliding in Germany
Gliding associations